The Griffith Golf Classic was a golf tournament held in Australia in 1978 in Griffith, New South Wales. It was a PGA Tour of Australia event with prize money of A$15,000.

Randall Vines beat Ian Stanley at the fifth hole of a sudden-death playoff after they tied on 280. Rob McNaughton and Peter Pearce tied for third place, a stroke behind.

Winners

References

Former PGA Tour of Australasia events
Golf tournaments in Australia
Golf in New South Wales
Griffith, New South Wales